Rear Admiral Presley Marion Rixey (14 July 1852, Culpeper, Virginia – 17 June 1928) was a Surgeon General of the United States Navy (1902–10) and personal physician to Presidents William McKinley and Theodore Roosevelt.

Biography

The older brother of John Franklin Rixey, Rixey earned his medical degree at the University of Virginia in 1873.  On 25 April 1877, he married Earlena J. English, daughter of Rear Admiral Earl English, United States Navy.

He was commissioned Assistant Surgeon in the Navy on 28 January 1874.
He was assigned as the personal physician to First Lady Ida McKinley in 1899 and spearheaded her improved health during the following few years. As he traveled with the McKinleys during this time providing personal care of Mrs. McKinley, he was present when President McKinley was shot in Buffalo.
He attended President McKinley after he was shot in Buffalo, New York, in 1901.

Rixey was appointed Surgeon General of the United States Navy on 15 February 1902 and served as Chief of the Bureau of Medicine and Surgery, with the rank of rear admiral, until his retirement on 4 February 1910.

During his tenure as Surgeon General, Rixey strongly supported the foundation of a women's nursing corps for the Navy. In his 1902 annual report, he stated that, "There has been a growing conviction in the minds of many of the most experienced medical officers of the service, especially since the war with Spain, that the employment of women for the nursing of the sick in our large hospitals would result in greater efficiency than has been obtained heretofore by the use of male nurses alone, and that such employment would not conflict with the conditions arising from the military character of the institution." With his help, the Navy Nurse Corps was finally established in 1908.

He accompanied President Theodore Roosevelt during his November 1906 visit to the Panama Canal Zone, and reviewed health and sanitation procedures there.

From 16 January 1913 to 16 April 1917, Rixey served as a member of the Naval Examining Board, presiding over it during the last four months of that period. He died at his home in Rosslyn, Virginia., on 17 June 1928.  He is interred in Arlington National Cemetery.

Awards
Rixey received the Spanish Order of Naval Merit from King Alphonso XIII of Spain for assistance he gave to the crew of the replica of the Santa Maria after that vessel suffered an explosion in New York Harbor on May 26, 1893, on its way to the World's Columbian Exposition.

Legacy
Rixey's estate in Arlington, Virginia, became the campus of Marymount University, and his home was renamed Main House.
The World War II casualty evacuation transport  was named for him.
The Rixey station on the Great Falls and Old Dominion Railroad was built for his estate.

References

Further reading

External links
 1905 Biographical Sketch
 Record at Arlington National Cemetery
 Bio at Navy History
 "Guarding the Health of Our Presidents", by Presley Marion Rixey, M.D.
 

1852 births
1928 deaths
United States Navy rear admirals (lower half)
University of Virginia School of Medicine alumni
Burials at Arlington National Cemetery
People from Culpeper, Virginia
American surgeons
Surgeons General of the United States Navy